The 2020 Ligue de Football de Saint Pierre et Miquelon was the 35th season of top-division football in Saint Pierre and Miquelon. Three clubs competed in the league: AS Saint Pierraise, A.S. Miquelonnaise and A.S. Ilienne Amateur. Due to the COVID-19 pandemic, the season was truncated to 12 matches instead of 16. The season began on 27 June 2020 instead of its normal May beginning and concluded on 19 September 2020.

Miquelonnaise won the championship, earning their first title since 2008.

Clubs

Table

References 

Ligue de Football de Saint Pierre et Miquelon seasons
Saint Pierre and Miquelon
Prem
Association football events curtailed due to the COVID-19 pandemic